The 1997 Preakness Stakes was the 122nd running of the Preakness Stakes thoroughbred horse race. The race took place on May 17, 1997, and was televised in the United States on the ABC television network. Silver Charm, who was jockeyed by Gary Stevens, won the race by a head over both runner-up Free House and Captain Bodgit.  Approximate post time was 5:29 p.m. Eastern Time. The race was run over a fast track in a final time of 1:54-4/5.  The Maryland Jockey Club reported total attendance of 102,118, this is recorded as second highest on the list of American thoroughbred racing top attended events for North America in 1997.

Payout 

The 122nd Preakness Stakes Payout Schedule

$2 Exacta:  (6–3) paid   $22.40

$2 Trifecta:  (6–3–8) paid   $38.20

The full chart 

 Winning Breeder: Mary L. Wootton; (FL) 
 Final Time: 1:54 4/5
 Track Condition: Fast
 Total Attendance: 102,118

See also 

 1997 Kentucky Derby

References

External links 

 

1997
1997 in horse racing
1997 in American sports
1997 in sports in Maryland
Horse races in Maryland